Sentinel-2A is a European optical imaging satellite launched in 2015. It is the first Sentinel-2 satellite launched as part of the European Space Agency's Copernicus Programme. The satellite carries a wide swath high-resolution multispectral imager with 13 spectral bands. It will perform terrestrial observations in support of services such as forest monitoring, land cover changes detection, and natural disaster management.

On 7 March 2017 the Sentinel-2A was joined in orbit by its sister satellite, Sentinel-2B.

Mission history

Launch
Sentinel 2A was launched by the Vega VV05 rocket on 23 June 2015 at 01:52 UTC. The satellite separated from the upper stage 54 min 43 s after liftoff.

Orbital operation
The satellite captured its first image 100 hours after launch, making a 290 km wide swath from Sweden through Central Europe to Algeria. Commissioning occurred in October 2015.

Between 20 and 23 January 2017 the spacecraft suffered a mission planning anomaly which resulted in loss of data from the Multi-Spectral Imager.

References

External links

 Sentinel-2 programme at ESA's Sentinel Online
 Sentinel-2 programme at ESA.int
Real-time orbital tracking - uphere.space

Copernicus Programme
Earth observation satellites of the European Space Agency
Spacecraft launched by Vega rockets
Spacecraft launched in 2015
Twin satellites